"The Lake House" is the 2nd episode of the eighth season of the American television police sitcom series Brooklyn Nine-Nine, and the 145th overall episode of the series. The episode was written by Neil Campbell and Marcy Jarreau and directed by Kevin Bray. It aired on August 12, 2021 on NBC, airing back-to-back with the previous episode, "The Good Ones".

The show revolves around the fictitious 99th precinct of the New York Police Department in Brooklyn and the officers and detectives that work in the precinct. In this episode, in order to help Holt through his separation, the squad goes with him on a weekend getaway to his lake house. But Jake and Terry are actually planning to reunite both Holt and Kevin. Meanwhile, Boyle helps Amy with Mac although the situation quickly spirals out of control while Rosa bonds with Scully while under the influence of cannabis edibles.

The episode received generally positive reviews from critics, who praised the humor though some found the episode to be too formulaic.

Plot
Intending to help Holt (Andre Braugher) on his separation, Terry (Terry Crews) suggests that the squad go with him on a weekend getaway at Holt's lake house to make him feel better. Amy (Melissa Fumero) brings Mac to the trip while Rosa (Stephanie Beatriz) starts using edibles to get herself through the trip.

At the lake house, the squad is whelmed at the fact that there is no lake in the area (it had been built by Kirsopp Lake) and that the house mostly consists of sitting rooms due to a technology ban. To complicate things, Jake (Andy Samberg) invited Kevin (Marc Evan Jackson) to the house in an attempt to rekindle his relationship with Holt. The squad refuses to help although Terry secretly aids Jake. They plan a romantic meeting for them by having them meet while they are birdwatching. However, the plan goes wrong when bees swarm the meeting and Kevin suffers an allergic reaction. Holt and Kevin realize Jake's plan. Holt relates Jake's scheme to the German book Das doppelte Lottchen. Nevertheless, they bond when Holt finds a corncrake and describes it to Kevin. Despite the moment, Kevin leaves the house. Jake then proves to Holt that Kevin still loves him through the birdwatch moment and they agree to go to couples therapy.

Meanwhile, Boyle (Joe Lo Truglio) asks Amy to help with putting Mac to sleep and she reluctantly accepts. She is frustrated to see that Boyle has no problem in taking care of the baby. However, Boyle accidentally locks Mac in his room after putting Mac down for his nap. Despite his attempts to hide it from Amy, she eventually finds out and crashes through the door to retrieve Mac. After a talk with Jake, she thanks Boyle for helping her but also scolds him for trapping Mac. Rosa bonds with Scully (Joel McKinnon Miller) while eating chips under the influence of the edibles and agrees to go with him to Buffalo, New York to tour chip factories, much to her horror after sobering up.

Production

Development
In July 2021, it was announced that the second episode of the season would be titled "The Lake House" and that Neil Campbell and Marcy Jarreau would serve as writers while Kevin Bray would direct.

Reception

Viewers

Critical reviews
"The Lake House" received generally positive reviews from critics. Matt Fowler of IGN gave the double-episode premiere a "great" 8 out of 10 rating, writing, "Brooklyn Nine-Nine shows its dexterity as season eight opens, providing a parade of comedy while also leaning into serious socio-political issues. It deftly navigates this tricky balance all while making sure each character remains true to their own personalities and motivations. The first two episodes are a hilarious start to what looks to be a stunningly good final season."

LaToya Ferguson of The A.V. Club gave the episode a "B−" rating, writing, "The issue with doing a double premiere is that while it may make sense from a network standpoint to include an episode that is simply non-stop jokes — especially after an episode like 'The Good Ones'  —it might not always tonally work. Or, as is the case for the combination of 'The Good Ones' and 'The Lake House,' the latter episode might somewhat undercut an aspect of the former."

Alan Sepinwall of Rolling Stone wrote, "Mostly, though, continuing Brooklyn Nine-Nine in this environment just seems untenable, with these episodes not likely to satisfy either viewers who expect the show to more radically change itself, or those who just want the same series it was before months of lockdown and protests. Give the creative team credit for at least trying to acknowledge the ugliness now very publicly associated with policing, but the post-office version of Nine-Nine feels like it would have been the better way to go for a chance to spend a few more weeks with Jake and his friends." Nick Harley of Den of Geek gave the episode a 4 star rating out of 5 and wrote, "This is Brooklyn Nine-Nine by the numbers, and it loses some points for lame, outdated jokes about weed edibles and a cliché parenting story with Amy and Charles. However, this is a great recurring bit about how Terry loves hedging, but hates ledges. Overall, it's a passable, if unspectacular installment."

Brian Tallerico of Vulture gave the episode a 4 star rating out of 5 and wrote, "Overall, it's an episode that spins its wheels a bit and feels longer than it is, but that also has enough unexpected sources of humor to balance out the wacky physical comedy like locked doors, allergic reactions, and a very high Rosa. It's not as ambitious as the season premiere, but a solid follow-up in that it counters the internal division of that half-hour with one about how much these people still truly need each other. After all, they're family." Emily VanDerWerff of Vox wrote, "'The Lake House' is full of standard sitcom stuff. Certainly, Brooklyn Nine-Nine should not be all heavy topics, all the time. People's lives go on in darkness. We're still patching up marriages and having babies and hanging out with friends, even in a pandemic. Life is never all one thing, and art should reflect that."

References

External links

2021 American television episodes
Brooklyn Nine-Nine (season 8) episodes
Television episodes directed by Kevin Bray (director)